The Canton of Prats-de-Mollo-la-Preste is a French former canton of the Pyrénées-Orientales department, in the Languedoc-Roussillon region. It had 2,767 inhabitants (2012). It was disbanded following the French canton reorganisation which came into effect in March 2015. It consisted of 6 communes, which joined the new canton of Le Canigou in 2015.

Composition
The canton of Prats-de-Mollo-la-Preste comprised 6 communes:
Prats-de-Mollo-la-Preste 
Coustouges
Lamanère
Saint-Laurent-de-Cerdans
Serralongue
Le Tech

References

Prats de Mollo la Preste
2015 disestablishments in France
States and territories disestablished in 2015